Colin Smith (born 9 January 1951) is a retired amateur Scottish football centre forward who played in the Scottish League for Queen's Park, Stranraer and Partick Thistle. He was capped by Scotland at amateur level.

References 

Scottish footballers
Scottish Football League players
Queen's Park F.C. players
Association football forwards
Scotland amateur international footballers
1951 births
People from Springburn
Partick Thistle F.C. players
Stranraer F.C. players
Living people